Something to Sing About! is a compilation album including specially recorded songs by American singer-songwriters John Denver and Tom Paxton. It was produced by Milt Okun and released in 1968.

Track listing
Josh White – "St. James Infirmary"
Ian and Sylvia – "Four Strong Winds"
Odetta Holmes – "John Henry"
Mississippi John Hurt – "Candy Man Blues"
John Denver – "The Wagoner Lad"
The Rooftop Singers – "Walk Right In"
Arlo Guthrie – "The Motorcycle Song"
Judy Collins – "The Cruel Mother"
Joan Baez & Bob Gibson – "The Virgin Mary Had One Son"
The Weavers – "When the Saints Go Marching In"
The Weavers – "Wimoweh"
Mary Travers – "Motherless Child (Without a Country)"
Peter Yarrow – "I Don't Want Your Millions Mister & East Virginia"
Noel Paul Stookey – "Minstrel Boy"
Ian and Sylvia – "When First Unto This Country"
Joan Baez – "All My Trials"
Tom Paxton – "Little Mohee"
Tom Paxton – "The Marvelous Toy"
The Smothers Brothers – "The Fox"
Milton Okun – "Hush, Little Baby"
Jean Ritchie – "March Down to Old Tennessee"
John Denver – "Old MacDonald Had a Farm"
Phil Ochs – "The Power and the Glory"
Ramblin' Jack Elliott – "More Pretty Girls Than One"
The Chad Mitchell Trio – "The Virgin Mary"
The Chad Mitchell Trio – "Forest Lawn"
The Chad Mitchell Trio – "The Bonnie Streets of Fyvie-O"
The Chad Mitchell Trio – "The Battle Hymn of the Republic Brought Down to Date" (written by Mark Twain)
Theodore Bikel – "Peat Bog Soldiers"
Glenn Yarbrough – "Johnny, I Hardly Knew You"
Jean Ritchie – "The Day Is Past and Gone"
Ronnie Gilbert – "Go From My Window"
Tom Paxton – "Spanish is the Loving Tongue"
Tom Paxton – "Danville Girl"
Tom Paxton – "Shenandoah"
Jean Ritchie – "Pretty Polly"
Jean Ritchie – "Dear Companion"
John Denver – "The Great Selkie of Sule Skerry"

References

John Denver compilation albums
Peter, Paul and Mary albums
Tom Paxton albums
1968 compilation albums
Albums produced by Milt Okun